Hormuz (also Romanized as Hormoz; also known as Qal‘eh-ye Hormoz) is a city and capital of Hormuz District, in Qeshm County, Hormozgan Province, Iran.

References 

Populated places in Qeshm County
Cities in Hormozgan Province

Hormuz Island